The Collezione di dipinti antichi della Banca Popolare dell’Emilia Romagna is a collection of classic Italian artworks from the last seven centuries in Emilia-Romagna, that has been purchased by Banca Popolare dell'Emilia Romagna.

Modern viccisitudes have concentrated the collection of Italian art to a few entities, most prominently banks. Those artworks in private hands in Italy cannot win export licences, hence find local homes with such patrons. It is housed in Modena.

Sources

To access images, descriptions, and biographies of the works and artists in the pinacoteca, go here , then click on culture, then on pinacoteca.

Collection

See also

 Art collection of Fondazione Cassa di Risparmio di Cesena
 Museo Civico d'Arte di Modena.

Art museums and galleries in Emilia-Romagna
Museums in Modena
Private art collections
BPER Banca